Roland Hofer (born 24 June 1990) is an Italian professional ice hockey defenseman who is currently playing for HC Pustertal Wölfe of the Alps Hockey League (AlpsHL).

Hofer has previously played in the Finnish second division, the Mestis league with Sport,  HeKi and Peliitat Heinola. Hofer competed in the 2012 IIHF World Championship as a member of the Italy men's national ice hockey team.

References

External links

1990 births
Bolzano HC players
Living people
Italian ice hockey defencemen
Germanophone Italian people
Peliitat Heinola players
Ritten Sport players
Vaasan Sport players
Wipptal Broncos players
Sportspeople from Sterzing